Doctor Sibelius is a 1962 West German drama film directed by Rudolf Jugert and starring Lex Barker, Barbara Rütting and Senta Berger.

It was shot at the Spandau Studios in Berlin and on location in the city. The film's sets were designed by the art director Paul Markwitz.

Cast
 Lex Barker as Dr. Georg Sibelius
 Barbara Rütting as Sabine Hellmann
 Senta Berger as Elisabeth Sibelius
 Anita Höfer as Susanne Helmann
 Loni Heuser as Mrs. Golling
 Berta Drews as Babette
 Sabine Bethmann as Sister Irene
 Harry Meyen as Dr. Möllendorf
 Rudolf Platte as Berger
 Hans Nielsen as Dr. Reinhardt
 Anneli Sauli as Gitta Hansen
 Elisabeth Flickenschildt as Helene Sebald

References

Bibliography

External links 
 

1962 films
1962 drama films
German drama films
West German films
1960s German-language films
Films directed by Rudolf Jugert
Gloria Film films
Medical-themed films
Films shot at Spandau Studios
1960s German films